"s Up" (short for Bottom's Up) is the fifth episode of the first series of British sitcom Bottom. It was first broadcast on 15 October 1991.

Synopsis
Richie and Eddie mind their landlord's shop for him, but end up getting stuck on the rooftop after trying to watch cricket from there.

Plot
As the episode begins, Richie is trying to enjoy an English Sunday morning, while Eddie is trying to watch what he believes are pornographic videos. After Eddie has forced Richie to sit down to watch the film, the pair observe that the film is not particularly erotic and Richie suggests that the "Furry Honey-pot Adventure" is probably a kids film. Eddie's other purchases also turn out to be innocent documentaries - "Big Jugs" is a history of Victorian pottery and "Swedish Lesbians in Blackcurrant Jam" is actually "Swedish Legends in Blackcurrant Jam Making". Eddie was disappointed that he spent an hour choosing some wrong videos and ruining his own Sunday entertainment. At this point, the landlord Mr. Harrison bursts into the flat asking Richie and Eddie if they would mind his shop, as he must deal with his mother's "stupid bloody funeral!".

In the shop, Richie demands to wear a white overcoat and make Eddie his assistant by wearing a brown coat. But Mr Harrison doesn't have one, so Richie tells Eddie to put his jacket on "back-to-front" so customers can see that Eddie is merely his assistant (there was no "assistant" name tag). Mr Harrison leaves and Richie engrosses himself in the role of shopkeeper, while Eddie empties all the packets of Hula Hoops that Richard repeatedly crushes with the counter flap. Richie goes on bizarre nationalist rants, repeatedly insisting that British things are 'best in the world', and is extremely rude to every customer who enters the shop. First, Richie insults a friend of Eddie's who came to complain that his newspaper was not delivered. The customer wants to take the newspaper Richie is reading and beats Richie's head against the counter when Richie argues with him. (Richie timidly calls him a "thug" after he leaves, to which Eddie responds, "British thugs, best in the world!")

Later, an old woman in the shop hears Richie talking to himself and inquires if he is mad, to which Richie responds by threatening to punch her. Then a doctor arrives to buy three bottles of champagne, but makes Richie cross when he calls him "assistant." Richie is in desperation with the state of the nation when Eddie suggests they go up to the roof and watch cricket. Eddie sets up a bell on the door so they know when people are entering the shop. Richie refuses to watch the cricket because he feels responsible for watching the shop, but then changes his mind when the same little old woman comes back with her big tattooed son who punches Richie in the face for threatening her.

On the roof, the pair chat and watch the cricket game before Eddie hears the bell and goes downstairs to serve a customer. Richie sets a trap for Eddie by sabotaging his deckchair, then he realizes that the roof flap cannot be opened from the outside and panics before Eddie opens the flap, hitting Richie in the face. Eddie then helps Richie to the booby-trapped chair and Richie injures himself further. When Eddie goes down to serve another customer Richie sets another trap with Eddie's favourite sandwich, pickled onion, where the trap door will smash Eddie's head. The plan backfires again and the hatch shuts, trapping both of them on the roof. People start looting the shop and Eddie climbs down the drainpipe to stop them. Richie has removed the string that holds the pipe to the roof, so the pipe collapses to the ground with Eddie on it. Eddie does manage to stop the looting and returns to the roof. As soon as Eddie gets back up, the door slams shut and it begins to rain. The episode ends with Richie punching Eddie off the roof.

Notes
This episode sees the first appearance of Roger Sloman as "Mr. Harrison", the boys' landlord. Sloman had previously appeared in The Young Ones and every episode of Hardwicke House, in which Mayall and Edmondson both make a guest appearance in the fifth episode.
Michael Redfern, who played the role of John Cooper ("Mr 55p") the shop customer, had starred as a policeman in The Young Ones, The Dangerous Brothers and Filthy Rich & Catflap.
This was the first episode that clearly confirmed that episode titles were to be added to the show's name, like "Bottom Smells" and "Bottom Accident", this episode being "Bottom's Up".
When Richie and Eddie are sitting up on the roof, a low flying jet is heard to fly over, leading to a section of dialogue referring to it. The dialogue is removed from the final edit of the episode for timing reasons (with Richie suddenly jumping onto his dreams of becoming a farmer), but is available to read in the first Bottom script book. Unlike many other removed scenes and chunks of dialogue, this removed section did not appear on the 'Fluff'  bloopers VHS release, and has not been reinserted for the Region 2 DVD releases.
Despite the fact that the video "Big Jugs" is portrayed as a pottery video it is clear that along the spine of the cassette case there is an 18 Certificate logo.
Eddie reads from the Sunday Sport: "The whole cast of Brookside are lesbians", to which Richie replies "British journalism Eddie – best in the world". This occurred more than two years before Brookside would depict the infamous lesbian kiss scene between Beth Jordache and Margaret Clemence.

Continuity and production errors
 In the scene where Eddie realises his pornographic videos are actually a children's film and documentaries about pottery and jam making, a close look reveals these videos nevertheless have an 18 certificate on the case.
 When Richie and Eddie go to the roof for the first time very bright sunshine comes through the roof access hatch. When Eddie falls off the roof and comes back the sky is supposed to be instantly overcast, yet the same bright light can be seen as he opens the hatch.

Cast

External links

Bottom (TV series)
1991 British television episodes